Black Crows is a French independent high end ski brand based in Chamonix, France that designs skis, poles and technical outerwear.

History 
Black Crows was founded in 2006 by French professional skiers Camille Jaccoux and Bruno Compagnet, along with ski industry leader Christophe Villemin.Black Crows were born out of a desire to collide beauty and efficiency into skis.

Products 
Black Crows launched its first skis - the Corvus - in 2006. Since then, Black Crows has developed a range of skis for different skiers and styles. Black Crows is known for their high-altitude skis. In 2012 Black Crows launched the freebird range for ski touring, in 2013 its first range of ski poles, in 2014 its first women's range, birdie, and in 2015, Black Crows presented its first outerwear range, Corpus.

References

External links 
 official website

Retail companies of France